Vote splitting is an electoral effect in which the distribution of votes among multiple similar candidates reduces the chance of winning for any of the similar candidates, and increases the chance of winning for a dissimilar candidate.

Vote splitting most easily occurs in plurality voting (also called first-past-the-post) in which each voter indicates a single choice and the candidate with the most votes wins, even if the winner does not have majority support. For example, if candidate A1 receives 30% of the votes, similar candidate A2 receives another 30% of the votes, and dissimilar candidate B receives the remaining 40% of the votes, plurality voting declares candidate B as the winner, even though 60% of the voters prefer either candidate A1 or A2.

Under such systems vote pairing (also called vote swapping, co-voting or peer to peer voting) can mitigate the effect, but it requires two voters in different districts to agree, and identifying probabilities of candidates winning in those districts.  A vote swap effectively preserves the total support for each party but moved it to where it is most effective.  It is legal and practiced in US, Canadian and especially UK elections. Pairwise-counting Condorcet methods minimize vote splitting effects. 

Cardinal voting methods are immune to vote splitting if it is assumed that voters rate candidates individually and independently of knowing the available alternatives in the election, using their own absolute scale, since each candidate is rated independently of each other. This assumption implies that some voters having meaningful preferences in an election with only two alternatives will necessarily cast a vote which has little or no voting power, or necessarily abstain. If it is assumed to be at least possible that any voter having preferences might not abstain, or vote their favorite and least favorite candidates at the top and bottom ratings respectively, then these systems are not immune to vote splitting. 

Plurality-runoff voting methods (like exhaustive ballot, two-round system/top-two primary, instant-runoff voting, supplementary vote, and contingent vote) still suffer from vote-splitting in each round, but can somewhat reduce its effects compared to single-round plurality voting.

A well-known effect of vote splitting is the spoiler effect, in which a popular candidate loses an election by a small margin because a less-popular similar candidate attracts votes away from the popular candidate, allowing a dissimilar candidate to win. As a result, the notion of vote splitting is controversial because it can discourage third-party candidates. 
 
All voting systems have some degree of inherent susceptibility to strategic nomination considerations. Strategic nomination takes advantage of vote splitting to defeat a popular candidate by supporting another similar candidate.

Vote splitting is one possible cause for an electoral system failing the independence of clones or independence of irrelevant alternatives fairness criteria.

Vote splitting and electoral systems

Different electoral systems have different levels of vulnerability to vote splitting.

Plurality voting 

Vote splitting most easily occurs in plurality voting because the ballots gather only the least bad preference of the voter. In the United States vote splitting commonly occurs in primary elections. The purpose of primary elections is to eliminate vote splitting among candidates in the same party before the general election. If primary elections or party nominations are not used to identify a single candidate from each party, the party that has more candidates is more likely to lose because of vote splitting among the candidates from the same party. Primary elections occur only within each party and so vote splitting can still occur between parties in the secondary election. In open primaries, vote splitting occurs between all candidates.

In addition to applying to single-winner voting systems (such as used in the United Kingdom, the United States and Canada), a split vote can occur in proportional representation methods that use election thresholds, such as in Germany, New Zealand and Turkey. In those cases, "fringe" parties that do not meet the threshold can take away votes from larger parties with similar ideologies.

Ordinal voting methods 

When ranked ballots are used, voters can vote for a minor party candidate as their first choice and indicate their order of preference for the remaining candidates, without regard to whether a candidate is in a major political party. For example, voters who support a very conservative candidate can select a somewhat-conservative candidate as their second choice, thus minimizing the chance that their vote will result in the election of a liberal candidate.

Runoff voting is less vulnerable to vote splitting than is plurality voting, but vote splitting can occur in any round of runoff voting.

Vote splitting rarely occurs when the chosen electoral system uses ranked ballots and a pairwise-counting method, such as a Condorcet method. Pairwise counting methods do not involve distributing each voter's vote between the candidates. Instead, pairwise counting methods separately consider each possible pair of candidates for all possible pairs. For each pair of candidates, there is a count for how many voters prefer the first candidate (in the pair) to the second candidate and how many voters have the opposite preference. The resulting table of pairwise counts eliminates the step-by-step distribution of votes, which facilitates vote splitting in other voting methods.

Voting methods that are vulnerable to strategic nomination, especially those that fail independence of clones, are vulnerable to vote splitting. Vote splitting also can occur in situations that do not involve strategic nomination, such as talent contests (such as American Idol) in which earlier rounds of voting determine the current contestants.

Cardinal voting methods 

Cardinal voting methods require an independent score to be given to candidates, as opposed to a ranking. The three primary methods are approval voting, with a range between 0–1, score voting with an arbitrary range, and STAR voting.

Cardinal voting methods are immune to vote splitting if it is assumed that voters rate candidates individually and independently of knowing the available alternatives in the election, using their own absolute scale, since each candidate is rated independently of each other. This assumption implies that some voters having meaningful preferences in an election with only two alternatives will necessarily cast a vote which has little or no voting power, or necessarily abstain. If it is assumed to be at least possible that any voter having preferences might not abstain, or vote their favorite and least favorite candidates at the top and bottom ratings respectively, then these systems are not immune to vote splitting. 

An alternative interpretation for the cardinal case is that the ballots themselves are immune to vote splitting (i.e. altering the ballot after they have been cast), but not the internal voter preferences (i.e. changing the context in which the ballots were created).

Historical examples
In Australia, the 1918 Swan by-election saw the conservative vote split between the Country Party and Nationalist Party, which allowed the Australian Labor Party to win the seat. That led the Nationalist government to implement preferential voting in federal elections to allow Country and Nationalist voters to transfer preferences to the other party and to avoid vote splitting. Today, the Liberal Party and National Party rarely run candidates in the same seats, which are known as three-cornered contests. When three-cornered contests do occur the Labor Party would usually direct preferences to the Liberals ahead of the Nationals as they considered the Liberal Party to be less conservative than the Nationals. The 1996 Southern Highlands state by-election in New South Wales is an example of this when the Nationals candidate Katrina Hodgkinson won the primary vote but was defeated after preferences to Liberal candidate Peta Seaton when Seaton received Labor Party preferences.
When the cities of Fort William and Port Arthur merged and (in 1969) voted on a name for the new town, the vote was split between the popular choices of "Lakehead" and "The Lakehead", allowing the third option to win, creating the town of Thunder Bay, Ontario.
In 1987, Roh Tae-woo won the South Korean presidential election with just under 36% of the popular vote because his two main liberal rivals split the vote. A similar scenario happened when in 1997 won by just Kim Dae-jung 40.3% because his two main conservative rivals split the vote.
In the 2000 presidential election in Taiwan, James Soong left Kuomintang (KMT) party and ran as an independent against KMT's candidate Lien Chan. This caused vote-splitting among KMT voters and resulted in victory for Democratic Progressive Party's candidate, Chen Shui-bian. It is the first time in Taiwan history that the KMT did not win a presidential election, and it became the opposition party.
In the 2004 Philippine presidential election, those who were opposed to Gloria Macapagal Arroyo's presidency had their vote split into the four candidates, thereby allowing Arroyo to win. The opposition had film actor Fernando Poe, Jr. as its candidate, but Panfilo Lacson refused to give way and ran as a candidate of a breakaway faction of the Laban ng Demokratikong Pilipino. Arroyo was later accused of vote-rigging.
 In 2006, the HDZ 1990 broke away from the HDZ BiH this allowed Željko Komšić to gain the Croat membership in the Presidency of Bosnia and Herzegovina with less than 40% which mainly came from Bosniak areas.
 Before the 2006 Nicaraguan presidential election, the Nicaraguan Liberal Alliance broke away from the Constitutionalist Liberal Party. This allowed Daniel Ortega to win the election with 38%, his two liberal opponents got 51% combined.
 Sicily is traditionally dominated by the centre-right but in the 2012 Sicilian regional election the centre-right was split between Nello Musumeci, Gianfranco Micciché, Mariano Ferro and Cateno De Luca allowing the centre-left Rosario Crocetta to win the election with just 30.5%.
From 1993 to 2004, the conservative vote in Canada was split between the Progressive Conservatives and the Reform (later the Alliance) Party. That allowed the Liberal Party to win almost all seats in Ontario and to win three successive majority governments.
The 2015 provincial election in Alberta saw the left-wing New Democratic Party win 62% of the seats with 40.6% of the province's popular vote after a division within the right-wing Progressive Conservative Party, which left it with only 27.8% of the vote, and its breakaway movement, the Wildrose Party, with 24.2% of the vote. In 2008, the last election in which the Progressive Conservative Party had been unified, it won 52.72% of the popular vote.  The Progressive Conservatives had won every provincial election since the 1971 election, making them the longest-serving provincial government in Canadian history—being in office for 44 years. This was only the fourth change of government in Alberta since Alberta became a province in 1905, and one of the worst defeats a provincial government has suffered in Canada. It also marked the first time in almost 80 years that a left-of-centre political party had formed government in Alberta since the defeat of the United Farmers of Alberta in 1935 and the Depression-era radical monetary reform policies of William Aberhart's Social Credit government.
During the 2021 Canadian federal election, it is speculated that the People's Party of Canada might have coast the CPC up to 24 seats.
In Canada, vote splits between the two major left-of-centre parties (Liberals and NDP) assisted the Conservative Party in winning the 2006, 2008, and 2011 federal elections, despite most of the popular vote going to left-wing parties in each race.
During the 2022 Ontario General Election, Progressive Conservative Doug Ford won a second term as Premier of the Province of Ontario. The Progressive Conservatives won several ridings due to vote splitting. ONDP and Liberal Party voters combined for 47.8% of votes, whereas Ford emerged victorious with only 40.82% of total votes.
Similarly, in Quebec, it is argued that the success of the Bloc Québécois in elections from 1993 to 2008 was because of the federalist vote being split between the Liberals and the Conservatives.
 In the 2008 Paraguayan presidential election, the candidate of the opposition alliance Fernando Lugo won the election with just 42% because Lino Oviedo ran on his own. The two right-wing candidates had 54% together but due to the split of the Colorado Party went into opposition for the first time since 1947.
 In the 2010 special election for the 1st congressional district of Hawaii, the Republican Charles Djou won against Democrats Colleen Hanabusa and Ed Case.
In the 2012 Egyptian presidential election, the two candidates who qualified for the runoff election, Freedom and Justice Party candidate Mohamed Morsi (24.8%) and the independent candidate Ahmed Shafik (23.7%), each received more votes than any other candidate, but they failed to get enough votes to prove that each winning candidate was actually more popular than the Dignity Party candidate Hamdeen Sabahi (20.7%), the independent candidate Abdel Moneim Aboul Fotouh (17.5%), or the independent candidate Amr Moussa (11.1%).

"Spoiler effect" 

The spoiler effect is the effect of vote splitting between candidates or ballot questions who often have similar ideologies.  One spoiler candidate's presence in the election draws votes from a major candidate with similar politics, thereby causing a strong opponent of both or several to win.  The minor candidate causing this effect is referred to as a spoiler.

The problem also exists in two-round system and instant-runoff voting though it is reduced, because weaker spoilers are eliminated. However, a candidate that can win head-to-head against all rivals (Condorcet winner) can still lose from third place in a 3-way vote split, a phenomenon known as the center squeeze. This occurred in the 2009 Burlington Vermont mayoral election and the 2022 Alaska's at-large congressional district special election. Some ranked voting systems satisfy the Condorcet winner criterion. Other preferential voting systems also suffer from variations of the spoiler effect, as they fail the independence of irrelevant alternatives (IIA) criterion (see ).

Some argue the problem is reduced in cardinal voting methods like approval voting, score voting, or majority judgment, since the rating of each candidate is independent of the ratings of other candidates, however this argument requires that some voters having meaningful preferences in an election with only two alternatives necessarily casting votes which has little or no voting power, or necessarily abstaining. If it is assumed to be at least possible that any voter having preferences might not abstain, or vote their favorite and least favorite candidates at the top and bottom ratings respectively, then these systems may not immune to vote splitting. It can be claimed that cardinal ballots themselves are immune to vote splitting (i.e. altering the ballot after they have been cast), but not the internal voter preferences (i.e. changing the context in which the ballots were created). Cardinal voting methods also fail the independence of irrelevant alternatives criterion.

Relationship with other effects
The spoiler candidate may alter an election result if they cause voters to switch their votes away from those seen as more electable and thus more politically viable, a common effect called vote splitting. If one opposing candidate is ideologically or politically similar and therefore receives far fewer votes than other opposing candidates to the spoiler candidate, vote splitting has a spoiler effect.

In some cases, even though spoiler candidates cannot win themselves, their influence upon the voters may enable the candidate to determine deliberately the more viable candidate who wins the election, a situation known as a kingmaker scenario.  With a first-past-the-post voting system, that is particularly feasible when spoiler candidates recommend tactical voting or run on a false manifesto to bolster the prospects for another candidate to win.

In a preferential voting system, voters can feel more inclined to vote for a minor party or independent as their first choice and can record a preference between the remaining candidates, whether they are in a major or established party or not. For example, voters for a minor left-wing candidate might select a major left-wing candidate as their second choice, thus minimizing the probability that their vote will result in the election of a right-wing candidate, or voters for an independent candidate perceived as libertarian, or simply as the voter prefers that ideology might select a particular libertarian candidate as their second choice, thus minimizing the probability of an authoritarian candidate being elected. Approval voting and proportional representation systems can also reduce the spoiler effect.

One of the main functions of political parties is to mitigate the effect of spoiler-prone voting methods by winnowing on a local level the contenders before the election. Each party nominates at most one candidate per office since each party expects to lose if they nominate more than one. In some cases, a party can expect to "lose" by "suffering a rival elected opponent" if they nominate more than zero, where two opponents exist and one is considered a candidate they can "work with" — a party may prefer the candidate who would win if the party nominates zero.

Thus, empirical observations of the frequency of spoiled elections do not provide a good measure of how prone to spoiling a particular voting method is, since the observations omit the relevant information about potential candidates who did not run because of not wanting to spoil the election.

Mathematical definitions

Possible mathematical definitions for the spoiler effect include failure of the independence of irrelevant alternatives (IIA) axiom, and vote splitting.

Arrow's impossibility theorem states that rank-voting systems are unable to satisfy the independence of irrelevant alternatives criterion without exhibiting other undesirable properties as a consequence. Gibbard's theorem shows that the same is true of cardinal voting systems like approval and score voting. However, different voting systems are affected to a greater or lesser extent by IIA failure. For example, instant runoff voting is considered to have less frequent IIA failure than First Past the Post (also known as Plurality Rule). The independence of Smith-dominated alternatives (ISDA) criterion is much weaker than IIA; unlike IIA, some ranked-ballot voting methods can pass ISDA.

A possible definition of spoiling based on vote splitting is as follows: Let W denote the candidate who wins the election, and let X and S denote two other candidates. If X would have won had S not been one of the nominees, and if (most of) the voters who prefer S over W also prefer X over W (either S>X>W or X>S>W), then S is a spoiler. Here is an example to illustrate: Suppose the voters' orders of preference are as follows:

The voters who prefer S over W also prefer X over W. W is the winner under Plurality Rule, Top Two Runoff, and Instant Runoff. If S is deleted from the votes (so that the 33% who ranked S on top now rank X on top) then X would be the winner (by 65% landslide majority). Thus S is a spoiler with these three voting methods.

Spoiler effect in American elections 
A 2014 analysis by Philip Bump for the Washington Post found that 1.5% of general election races in the U.S. from 2006 to 2012 were spoiled by third-party candidates.

Historically, the Democratic and Republican parties have benefited from the alleged spoiler effect created by the existing U.S. plurality voting system. This benefit is based in the theory that not voting for other parties and for independents and that third parties and independent candidates themselves declining to run, means to avoid "wasting votes" or splitting the vote causing an election result not wanted.

Examples of vote splitting in the United States include:

 In the 1884 presidential election, the Prohibition Party's presidential nominee, former Republican Governor John St. John, took 147,482 votes, with 25,006 votes coming from New York, where Grover Cleveland defeated James G. Blaine by just 1,149 votes, allowing Cleveland to defeat Blaine in a very close contest (219-182 in the electoral college and a margin of 0.57% in the popular vote). Republicans were so angered by St. John's party switch, which caused their first presidential election defeat since 1856, that on November 27, 1884, an effigy of St. John was burned in Topeka, Kansas in front of a crowd of three thousand people. 

 In 1912, Progressive Party candidate Theodore Roosevelt won almost 700,000 votes more than did the Republican incumbent, William Howard Taft, and thus it could be said that Roosevelt was the spoiler for Taft in that election. This argument worried Republicans, who, after Woodrow Wilson won the 1912 election, became concerned that Roosevelt might return to split the Republican vote again.

 In the 1934 Oregon gubernatorial election, Republican Peter Zimmerman ran as an independent, receiving 31.7% of the vote compared to Democratic victor Charles Martin's 38.6% and Republican nominee Joe Dunne's 28.7%. Altogether, the Republicans received 60.4% of the vote.

 In 1968, George Wallace ran for president as the American Independent Party's nominee. He received numerous votes from Southern demographics that typically voted for Democratic candidates, thereby undercutting the candidacy of that election's Democratic nominee, Hubert Humphrey.

 In the 1990 Oregon gubernatorial election conservative activist Al Mobley ran as an independent and received 144,062 votes for 13.0% of the vote while in the same election Democrat Barbara Roberts defeated Republican David B. Frohnmayer by 64,103 votes.

 In the 1992 presidential election Ross Perot ran as an independent and due to his overall conservatism, he was widely seen as a spoiler candidate who split the Republican vote; however, this has been strongly disputed by subsequent research, which found that Perot voters split about equally in which of the two major-party candidates they preferred as a second choice.

 In 2000, Al Gore, the Democratic candidate, lost to George W. Bush due to a difference of 537 votes in the state of Florida. Green Party candidate and progressive Ralph Nader received 97,421 votes in Florida on a platform very similar to Gore's. When polled, 45% of Nader supporters said they would have voted for Gore if Nader didn't run while another poll said 60% of Nader supporters would've voted for Gore if Nader didn't run. Due to this, vote splitting has commonly been called the "Nader Effect" since 2000.

In the special 2003 California gubernatorial race won by Republican Arnold Schwarzenegger, which did not involve a primary election and which listed 135 candidates on the ballot, concerns about vote splitting caused the Democrats to withdraw all but one of their major candidates and the Republicans to withdraw most of their candidates. Likewise, many supporters of Republican Tom McClintock changed their mind at the last minute and voted for Schwarzenegger for fear of the Democratic candidate, Cruz Bustamante, winning.

 In 2008, Democrat Al Franken was elected the junior senator from Minnesota, defeating Norm Coleman by only 0.1%. Independent candidate Dean Barkley received over 15% of the vote, and a 2014 analysis by Time found that without Barkley in the race, Franken would have lost the election to Coleman.

 In 2010, Green Party candidate Bill Scheurer ran for Illinois' 8th Congressional District against Democratic incumbent Melissa Bean. Republican Joe Walsh won the election in a surprising upset with only a 291-vote (0.1%) difference with Bean, while Scheurer received 6,494 votes (3.2%).

 As a result of the 2011 Wisconsin protests and subsequent recall elections, the Wisconsin Republican Party has encouraged spoiler candidates to run in the recall elections on the Democrat ticket in order to force the Democrats into a primary election. Republicans argued that this would even the playing field in the recalls, as incumbents facing recall did not have the time to campaign due to their work load in the state senate.
 In Maine's 2010 and 2014 gubernatorial elections, Eliot Cutler ran as a left-wing independent. In the 2010 election Paul LePage narrowly defeated him with 218,065 votes to 208,270 votes with the Democratic nominee Libby Mitchell receiving 109,387 votes and possibly spoiling the election for Cutler. However, in 2014 Cutler performed worse and only received 51,518 votes, but it was still greater than the difference between LePage and Mike Michaud causing a possible spoiler effect. These elections lead to an increase support in ranked choice voting leading to Maine adopting the voting system due to LePage's unpopularity and him winning twice only with pluralities.

 In both the 2013 Virginia gubernatorial election and the 2014 Virginia US Senate Election, Libertarian Robert Sarvis received a number of votes greater than the difference between the Republican and Democratic candidates.

 Several races in the 2014 election cycle were allegedly influenced by spoiler candidates, most notably Hawaii's gubernatorial elections and the Kansas senatorial race. In the Mississippi senatorial Republican primary, a paper candidate, Thomas Carey, who received less than two percent of the vote prevented both top contenders, incumbent Thad Cochran and challenger Chris McDaniel, from avoiding a runoff. Had Carey not run, the race between McDaniel and Cochran would have avoided a runoff.
 In the 2016 United States presidential election, Libertarian candidate Gary Johnson won over 4 million votes, including in the crucial states of Michigan, Wisconsin, Pennsylvania, Arizona, and Florida. Donald Trump had won those states by 4% over Hillary Clinton. If Johnson's voters had all voted for Clinton instead, Clinton would have won the electoral map by 5 states. In addition, Green Party candidate Jill Stein won nearly 1.5 million votes, drawing a vote total in Pennsylvania, Michigan, and Wisconsin that exceeded the margin between Trump and Clinton.

 In the 2020 United States presidential election, Libertarian candidate Jo Jorgensen's vote share in Pennsylvania, Wisconsin, Georgia, and Arizona was higher than Biden's margin of victory over Trump. While many pundits claimed that Trump would have won had she not run, others believed that many Jorgensen voters would have abstained from voting, as opposed to voting for Trump.

Other countries
In the German presidential election of 1925, Communist Ernst Thälmann refused to withdraw his candidacy although it was extremely unlikely that he would have won, and the leadership of the Communist International urged him not to run. In the second (and final) round of balloting, Thälmann shared 1,931,151 votes (6.4%). Centre Party candidate Wilhelm Marx, backed by pro-republican parties, won 13,751,605 (45.3%). The right-wing candidate Paul von Hindenburg won 14,655,641 votes (48.3%). If most of Thälmann's supporters had voted for Marx, Marx likely would have won the election. That election had great significance because after 1930, Hindenburg increasingly favoured authoritarian means of government, and in 1933, he appointed Adolf Hitler as chancellor. Hindenburg's death the following year gave Hitler unchecked control of the German government.

In New Zealand, there have been two notable cases of the spoiler effect. In the 1984 general election, the free-market New Zealand Party deliberately ran for office to weaken support former Prime Minister Robert Muldoon, the incumbent. The 1993 general election saw the New Zealand Labour Party's vote split by The Alliance, which has been attributed to the vagaries of the plurality vote. In response to these problems, New Zealand has since adopted mixed-member proportional representation.

In the 1994 European Elections, Richard Huggett stood as a "Literal Democrat" candidate for the Devon and East Plymouth seat, with the name playing on that of the much larger Liberal Democrats. Huggett took over 10,000 votes, and the Liberal Democrats lost by 700 votes to the Conservative Party. The Registration of Political Parties Act 1998, brought in after the election, introduced a register of political parties and ended the practice of deliberately confusing party descriptions.

Likewise, in France, the 2002 presidential elections have been cited as a case of the spoiler effect: the numerous left-wing candidates, such as Christiane Taubira and Jean-Pierre Chevènement, both from political parties allied to the French Socialist Party, or the three candidates from Trotskyist parties, which altogether totalled around 20%, have been charged with making Lionel Jospin, the Socialist Party candidate, lose the two-round election in the first round to the benefit of Jean-Marie Le Pen, who was separated from Jospin by only 0.68%. Some also cite the case of some districts in which the moderate right and the far right had more than half of the votes together, but the left still won the election; they accuse the left of profiting from the split. Also in the presidential elections 1969 (with five left-wing candidates which combined had 32%), in 2017 (split between four candidates which had 27% combined) and in 2022 (six left-wing candidates with 32% combined), the left failed to reach the run-off which may be traced back the amount of left-of-centre candidates. Similarly in the 1993 parliamentary election, where the green parties ran against the parties of the presidential majority. This led to many right-wing run-offs and the most right-wing dominated parliament since 1968.

In Hong Kong, vote splitting is very common for the pro-democracy camp, which caused it to suffer greatly in many elections, including the 2016 Hong Kong legislative election and the 2015 Hong Kong local elections. Pro-democracy supporters typically have different ideologies and suffer from factional disputes that are exacerbated after the advent of localist groups. However, many have wider aggregate support fewer seats are earned than the pro-Beijing camp, an example being in Kowloon East in which pro-democracy parties got over 55% of cast ballots but won only 2 seats out of 5.

In Greece, Antonis Samaras was the Minister for Foreign Affairs for the liberal conservative government of New Democracy under Prime Minister Konstantinos Mitsotakis but ended up leaving and founding the national conservative Political Spring in response to the Macedonia naming dispute, resulting in the 1993 Greek legislative election where PASOK won with its leader Andreas Papandreou making a successful political comeback, which was considered to be responsible for the Greek government debt crisis.

In the run up to 2019 UK General Election, the Brexit Party, led by former UKIP leader Nigel Farage, initially put up candidates in 600 seats after a strong showing for the newly formed party in the 2019 European Elections, but days later, he reversed his position after Conservative British Prime Minister Boris Johnson stated that he would not consider an electoral pact with the Brexit Party. That was seen as benefiting the Conservative Party and disadvantaging the Labour Party. Farage later encouraged voters not to vote for the Labour Party in areas that traditionally favoured it but voted to leave in the 2016 EU Membership Referendum but instead to vote tactically. After the Conservatives' decisive victory, it was suggested by some media outlets and political analysts that Farage had acted as "kingmaker" and stalking horse and effectively won the election for the Tories, as Farage's decision avoided splitting the vote.

Klimaliste has been accused of splitting the vote which would have went Alliance 90/The Greens. For example in the 2021 Baden-Württemberg state election a Red-Green coalition was just a single seat short of a majority while Klimaliste missed the threshold with receiving 0.9% of the vote.

See also

 Electoral threshold
 Instant-runoff voting
 Independence of clones
 Independence of irrelevant alternatives
 Strategic nomination
 Tactical voting
 Voting Rights Act of 1965

Notes

References

Psephology
Splitting